White sugar, also called table sugar, granulated sugar, or regular sugar, is a commonly used type of sugar, made either of beet sugar or cane sugar, which has undergone a refining process.

Description 
The refining process completely removes the molasses to give the white sugar, sucrose. It has a purity higher than 99.7%. White sugars produced from sugar cane and sugar beet are chemically indistinguishable: it is possible, however, to identify its origin through a carbon-13 analysis.

White sugar (and some brown sugar) produced from sugar cane may be refined using bone char by a few sugar cane refiners. For this reason white sugar from sugar cane may not be vegan. Beet sugar has never been processed with bone char and is vegan.

From a chemical and nutritional point of view, white sugar does not contain—in comparison to brown sugar—some minerals (such as calcium, potassium, iron and magnesium) present in small quantities in molasses. The only detectable differences are, therefore, the white color and the less intense flavor.

References

Related items 
 Brown sugar

External links 
 All about White sugar – The Spruce Eats

Sugars